Electricity pricing (also referred to as electricity tariffs or the price of electricity) can vary widely by country or by locality within a country. Electricity prices are dependent on many factors, such as the price of power generation, government taxes or subsidies,  taxes, local weather patterns, transmission and distribution infrastructure, and multi-tiered industry regulation. The pricing or tariffs can also differ depending on the customer-base, typically by residential, commercial, and industrial connections.

According to the U.S. Energy Information Administration (EIA), "Electricity prices generally reflect the cost to build, finance, maintain, and operate power plants and the electricity grid." Where pricing forecasting is the method by which a generator, a utility company, or a large industrial consumer can predict the wholesale prices of electricity with reasonable accuracy. Due to the complications of electricity generation, the cost to supply electricity varies minute by minute.

Some utility companies are for-profit entities and their prices include a financial return for owners and investors. These utility companies can exercise their political power within existing legal and regulatory regimes to guarantee a financial return and reduce competition from other sources like a distributed generation.

Electricity prices around the world

Rate structure
In standard regulated monopoly markets like the United States, there are multilevel governance structures that set electricity rates. The rates are determined through a regulatory process that is overseen by a Public Service Commission. In addition, the Federal Energy Regulatory Commission (FERC) oversees the wholesale electricity market along with the interstate transmission of electricity. Public Service Commissions (PSC), which are also known as Public utilities commission (PUC), regulate utility rates within each state.

The inclusion of renewable energy distributed generation (DG) and advanced metering infrastructure (AMI or smart meter) in the modern electricity grid has introduced many alternative rate structures. There are several methods that modern utilities structure residential rates:

Simple (or fixed) – the rate at which customers pay a flat rate per kWh
Tiered (or step) – rate changes with the amount of use (some go up to encourage energy conservation, others go down to encourage use and electricity provider profit)
Time of use (TOU) – different rate depending on the time of day
Demand rates – based on the peak demand for electricity a consumer uses
Tiered within TOU – different rates depending on how much they use at a specific time of day
Seasonal rates – charged for those that do not use their facilities year-round (e.g. a cottage)
Weekend/holiday rates – generally different rates than during normal times. among the few residential rate structures offered by modern utilities.

The simple rate charges a specific dollar per kilowatt hour ($/kWh) consumed. The tiered rate is one of the more common residential rate programs. The tiered rate charges a higher rate as customer usage increases. TOU and demand rates are structured to help maintain and control a utility's peak demand. The concept at its core is to discourage customers from contributing to peak-load times by charging them more money to use power at that time. Historically, rates have been minimal at night because the peak is during the day when all sectors are using electricity. Increased demand requires additional energy generation, which is traditionally provided by less efficient "peaker" plants that cost more to generate electricity than "baseload" plants. However, as greater penetration from renewable energy sources, like solar, are on a grid the lower cost, electricity is shifted to midday when solar generates the most energy.

An October 2018 study by UK energy supplier Octopus Energy demonstrated the benefits of time of use (TOU) tariffs in particular, with customers on its Agile price model found to have shifted electricity consumption out of peak periods by 28%, helping consumers save £188 per year compared to standard variable tariffs.

A feed-in tariff (FIT) is an energy-supply policy that supports the development of renewable power generation. FITs give financial benefits to renewable power producers. In the United States, FIT policies guarantee that eligible renewable generators will have their electricity purchased by their utility. The FIT contract contains a guaranteed period of time (usually 15–20 years) that payments in dollars per kilowatt hour ($/kWh) will be made for the full output of the system.

Net metering is another billing mechanism that supports the development of renewable power generation, specifically, solar power. The mechanism credits solar energy system owners for the electricity their system adds to the grid. Residential customers with rooftop photovoltaic (PV) systems will typically generate more electricity than their home consumes during daylight hours, so net metering is particularly advantageous. During this time where generation is greater than consumption, the home's electricity meter will run backward to provide a credit on the homeowner's electricity bill. The value of solar electricity is less than the retail rate, so net metering customers are actually subsidized by all other customers of the electric utility.

Price comparison by power source

The cost of electricity also differs by the power source. The net present value of the unit-cost of electricity over the lifetime of a generating asset is known as the levelized cost of electricity (LCOE). LCOE is the best value to compare different methods of generation on a consistent basis.

The generating source mix of a particular utility will thus have a substantial effect on their electricity pricing. Electric utilities that have a high percentage of hydroelectricity will tend to have lower prices, while those with a large amount of older coal-fired power plants will have higher electricity prices. Recently the LCOE of solar photovoltaic technology has dropped substantially. In the United States, 70% of current coal-fired power plants run at a higher cost than new renewable energy technologies (excluding hydro) and by 2030 all of them will be uneconomic. In the rest of the world 42% of coal-fired power plants were operating at a loss in 2019.

Electricity price forecasting

Power quality
Excessive Total Harmonic Distortions (THD) and low power factor are costly at every level of the electricity market. The impact of THD is difficult to estimate, but it can potentially cause heat, vibrations, malfunctioning and even meltdowns.  The power factor is the ratio of real to apparent power in a power system. Drawing more current results in a lower power factor. Larger currents require costlier infrastructure to minimize power loss, so consumers with low power factors get charged a higher electricity rate by their utility.   Power quality is typically monitored at the transmission level. A spectrum of compensation devices mitigate bad outcomes, but improvements can be achieved only with real-time correction devices (old style switching type, modern low-speed DSP driven and near real-time). Most modern devices reduce problems, while maintaining return on investment and significant reduction of ground currents. Power quality problems can cause erroneous responses from many kinds of analog and digital equipment.

Phase balancing
The most common distribution network and generation is done with 3 phase structures, with special attention paid to the phase balancing and resulting reduction of ground current. It is true for industrial or commercial networks where most power is used in 3 phase machines, but light commercial and residential users do not have real-time phase balancing capabilities. Often this issue leads to unexpected equipment behavior or malfunctions and in extreme cases fires. For example, sensitive professional analog or digital recording equipment must be connected to well-balanced and grounded power networks. To determine and mitigate the cost of the unbalanced electricity network, electric companies charge by demand or as a separate category for heavy unbalanced loads. A few simple techniques are available for balancing that require fast computing and real-time modeling.

See also
Cost of electricity by source
Demand response
Electricity billing in the UK
Electricity meter
Electricity liberalization
Electricity market
Energy economics
Feed-in tariff
Fixed bill
Levelised energy cost
Price controls
Spark spread
Stranded costs

References

Electricity economics
Pricing